Dana Dean Altman (born June 16, 1958) is an American college basketball coach who is the head coach of the Oregon Ducks men's team.  Previously he was head coach at Creighton, Kansas State and Marshall. Altman  has won conference coach of the year awards at each school he has coached, and has led his teams to 15 appearances in the  NCAA tournament.

College education
Dana Altman began playing college basketball at Fairbury Junior College (now Southeast Community College) in Fairbury, Nebraska.  He earned an associate degree in business administration there in 1978.  He then received his undergraduate degree in the same field at Eastern New Mexico University in 1980.

Coaching career

Marshall
In his first NCAA Division I head coaching position, Altman became the head men's basketball coach at Marshall University in Huntington, West Virginia in 1989. Although he only spent one season as the coach of the Thundering Herd, Altman led the Herd to a 15–13 record and to runners-up in the Southern Conference tournament losing to East Tennessee State in the tournament championship game. Altman left Marshall after only one season to replace his mentor, Lon Kruger, at Kansas State.

Kansas State
Although his four-year tenure as Kansas State's head coach produced one NCAA tournament appearance, Altman will be remembered most for his ability to win close ball games, and for pulling off some of the biggest upsets in school history.

Altman's teams were 28–13 in games decided by six points or less, which included a 6–1 mark in one-point games. His 1992–93 club perpetuated a Kansas State tradition. Picked to finish last in the Big Eight, Altman's Wildcats won 11 games in the final minute, earned the school's first Top 25 ranking in five seasons, finished 19–11, reached the championship game of the Big Eight tournament and returned Kansas State to the NCAA tournament for the 21st time.

Altman's peers named him Big Eight Coach-of-the-Year in 1993 and he capped the season by upsetting No. 6 Kansas 74–67 in the semifinals of the conference tournament.

The following season, he made it two in a row over Kansas when he upset the No. 1 ranked Jayhawks 68–64 in Lawrence. His 1993–94 squad finished the season with a 20–14 record and advanced to the NIT Final Four in New York City.  Following the season, he accepted the head coaching position at Creighton, in his home state of Nebraska.

Creighton
During his time at Creighton, his athletes earned three All-American honors on the court and three other Academic All-America laurels in the classroom. Three players he coached at Creighton, Kyle Korver, Rodney Buford, and Anthony Tolliver, have played in the NBA.

Altman was named Valley Coach of the Year twice, first in 2001 and also in 2002.  Altman was a finalist for the Naismith College Coach of the Year and named the NABC District 12 and USBWA District VI Coach of the Year in 2002–03.

Altman became the 14th head coach in Creighton history following the 1993–94 season after four years as the head coach at Kansas State.  Hired on March 31, 1994, Altman inherited a team that posted a 7–22 ledger the year before his arrival and led the Bluejays to a slightly improved 7–19 record in 1994–95 before his 1995–96 squad jumped to 14–15. In 1996–97, Altman's team was 15–15 and followed with another substantial jump to 18–10 and a bid to the NIT in 1997–98.

On April 2, 2007, Altman announced that he would become the head coach for the Arkansas Razorbacks, in a deal that was rumored to be a $1.5 million per year, 5-year contract.  Only one day later he had a change of heart and returned to Omaha and his team at Creighton, citing family reasons. He had not consulted his wife or high school age daughter prior to accepting the job.

On February 5, 2009, Altman won his 300th game as Creighton head coach.  In his first 13 years at Creighton, Altman ranked third all-time on the coaching victories list in the 99-year history of the Missouri Valley Conference, trailing only Hall of Fame coaches Henry Iba and Eddie Hickey.  His record in 16 seasons with the Creighton Bluejays was 327–176, the most wins in school history.

Oregon
On April 24, 2010, Altman agreed to a 7-year contract worth nearly $2 million per year with Oregon.  The university made it official on April 26 with a press conference. As of 2020, he is the currently highest-paid public employee of the state of Oregon.

Under Dana Altman, the University of Oregon has consistently been one of the top basketball schools in the Pac-12, with notable conference achievements including three regular season Pac-12 Conference championships (2016, 2017, 2019), and three Pac-12 tournament championships (2013, 2016, 2019). His prior coaching experience playing against UCLA was one of the main reasons why Oregon recruited him, as the Ducks wanted to improve standings. Altman has also led the Ducks to success in the NCAA tournament, including a Final Four run in 2017.

In 2013 Oregon earned its first NCAA tournament bid under Dana Altman. This run ended in the sweet sixteen. Oregon continued this success, making the NCAA tournament in 2014 and 2015. Both the 2013–14 and 2014–15 seasons ended in the round of 32.

On March 13, 2016, Oregon earned its first #1 seed in the NCAA tournament in program history thanks to winning the Pac-12 regular season and conference tournament titles.

On March 26, 2016, the Oregon Ducks lost, as a #1 seed in the Elite Eight to the #2 seeded Oklahoma Sooners due in large part to a lights out shooting performance by Buddy Hield.

On November 11, 2016, Oregon and Altman agreed on a seven-year contract extension that will keep him in Eugene through the 2022–2023 season.

On March 25, 2017, Altman led the #3 seeded Ducks to their first Final Four in 78 years with a 74–60 upset over #1 seed Kansas in Kansas City. This was Altman's first Final Four appearance. Oregon would go on to lose in the Final Four to end what was considered a massively successful season for Altman and the Ducks 

On November 17, 2017, Altman won his 600th career Division I game in a 114–56 Ducks win over Alabama State.

On March 14, 2019, Oregon and Altman agreed on a three-year contract extension that will keep him in Eugene through the 2025–2026 season.  Two weeks later, Altman notched his 235th win at Oregon with a victory over UC Irvine in the second round of the NCAA Tournament, tying Ernie Kent as the winningest coach in school history. He broke the record with Oregon's first win of the following season, over Fresno State on November 5, 2019.

Personal life
Altman was born in Wilber, Nebraska.  He is married to the former Reva Phillips. They have three sons Jordan, Chase, and Spencer, and one daughter, Audra.  Altman, who had been an Eagle Scout in the Boy Scouts of America, received a Distinguished Eagle Scout Award in 2008.

Head coaching record

See also
 List of college men's basketball coaches with 600 wins
 List of NCAA Division I Men's Final Four appearances by coach

References

1958 births
Living people
Basketball coaches from Nebraska
Basketball players from Nebraska
Creighton Bluejays men's basketball coaches
Eastern New Mexico Greyhounds men's basketball players
Guards (basketball)
Junior college men's basketball players in the United States
Kansas State Wildcats men's basketball coaches
Marshall Thundering Herd men's basketball coaches
Moberly Greyhounds men's basketball coaches
Oregon Ducks men's basketball coaches
People from Crete, Nebraska
Western Colorado Mountaineers men's basketball coaches
American men's basketball players